Route 273 is a highway in northwestern Missouri.  Its northern terminus is at the Kansas state line halfway across the Missouri River near Atchison, Kansas. At this point it is concurrent with U.S. Route 59 and Route 45 (with which it shares the terminus).  The southern terminus is at Route 92 in Tracy.  All but the southeasternmost six miles (10 km) overlap Route 45. The road runs through Platte and Buchanan Counties.

Major intersections

References

273
Transportation in Buchanan County, Missouri
Transportation in Platte County, Missouri